Waiting for the Floods is the first and only studio album by British new wave band The Armoury Show. It was released in September 1985 and entered the UK Albums chart at number 57 that month.

Reception 

In his retrospective review, Dan LeRoy of AllMusic praised the album, writing "[Richard] Jobson created an album that, though it went largely unnoticed, outdid Big Country – and nearly every other "big-guitar" band of the time, save U2 – in anthemic power."

Jeffrey X. Martin of Popshifter gave the album a glowing review when it was reissued as a two-disc set in 2013, writing, "Theatrical without being pompous, Waiting For The Floods is Arthurian nationalism at its bravest and most stentorian. You half expect the songs to rise up from the lake, bearing Excalibur."

Track listing 

The 2-disc reissue is not a complete compilation of The Armoury Show's work.  Missing are two of their three charted singles; the original non-LP single recording of "Castles In Spain" (produced by Nick Tauber), and the non-LP A-side "Love in Anger".  Also missing is "Uptown Downtown", which was on the "Love in Anger" 12", and the band-produced demo version of "A Feeling" which appeared on the 12" of "We Can Be Brave Again".

Personnel 
 The Armoury Show

 Richard "The Captain" Jobson – lead vocals, drums, drum programming
 John "The Legend" McGeoch – lead and rhythm guitar, backing vocals; 12-string guitar and piano on "Sense of Freedom"; Arpeggio Roland guitar synthesizer on "Avalanche"
 Russell "Universe" Webb – fretless bass, keyboards, drums, drum programming, harmony and backing vocals
 John "Doylie" Doyle – drums, drum programming, backing vocals

 Additional personnel
Nick "Fats" Launay - last bass note on "Glory of Love"; drum programming on "Avalanche"
 Paul Fishman – keyboards, programming
 Billy Currie – violin on "Higher Than the World"
Robin Jones - percussion, congas, timbales, cabasa, shaker, tambourine
John Batten - backing vocals on "Castles in Spain"
Billy Nicholls, Chris Staines, Mike Nicholls, Steve Hunt - backing vocals on "Avalanche"
 Technical

 Nick Launay – production, engineering, mixing

See also
Magazine
Public Image Ltd.
Siouxsie and the Banshees
Skids
Slik

References

External links 
 

1985 debut albums
Albums produced by Nick Launay
The Armoury Show albums
EMI America Records albums